SearchOhio is a consortium of public libraries in the state of Ohio that provides borrowing access to more than 10 million library items, including books, movies and music, providing easy access to information and rapid delivery of library materials throughout the state. It was established in 2006.

Cardholders at any participating library can request items online through the SearchOhio catalog (powered by INN-Reach, a product of Innovative Interfaces) to be delivered to their library in 3–5 business days. Items are shipped back to the owning library on return.

Participating libraries 
SearchOhio makes public library collections available to the communities served by the following libraries (as of September 2017).

Akron-Summit County Public Library
Public Library of Cincinnati and Hamilton County
Clermont County Public Library
Cuyahoga County Public Library
Cuyahoga Falls Library
Delaware County District Library
Greene County Public Library
Kent Free Library
The Lane Libraries
Louisville Public Library
Mansfield/Richland County Public Library
Massillon Public Library
Mentor Public Library
MidPointe Library System
Portage County District Library
Reed Memorial Library
Rodman Public Library
Salem Public Library
Stark County District Library
Stow-Munroe Falls Public Library
Toledo-Lucas County Public Library
Wadsworth Public Library
Warren-Trumbull County Public Library
Washington-Centerville Public Library
Westerville Public Library
Westlake Porter Public Library
Public Library of Youngstown and Mahoning County

References

External links 
 SearchOhio catalog
 SearchOhio wiki

Library consortia in Ohio
2006 establishments in Ohio